László Farkas (born 2 September 1960) is a Hungarian biathlete. He competed in the men's 20 km individual event at the 1992 Winter Olympics.

References

External links
 

1960 births
Living people
Hungarian male biathletes
Olympic biathletes of Hungary
Biathletes at the 1992 Winter Olympics
People from Gyöngyös
Sportspeople from Heves County